Fouad Chafik (born 16 October 1986) is a professional footballer who plays as a defender for the Morocco national team.

Club career
In June 2016, Chafik joined Dijon, newly promoted to Ligue 1, on a two-year contract from Laval.

On 31 August 2021, he moved to Switzerland and signed with Lausanne-Sport.

International career
Born in France, Chafik was called up for the Morocco national football team for the first time in May 2015. He made his debut for the Moroccan squad against Libya in a qualifying match for the African Cup of Nations 2017.

References

External links
 Fouad Chafik at foot-national.com
 
 
 

1986 births
Living people
Sportspeople from Drôme
Citizens of Morocco through descent
Moroccan footballers
Morocco international footballers
French footballers
French sportspeople of Moroccan descent
Association football defenders
FC Istres players
Stade Lavallois players
UMS Montélimar players
Dijon FCO players
FC Lausanne-Sport players
Championnat National players
Ligue 1 players
Ligue 2 players
Swiss Super League players
Moroccan expatriate footballers
Expatriate footballers in Switzerland
Moroccan expatriate sportspeople in Switzerland
2017 Africa Cup of Nations players
Footballers from Auvergne-Rhône-Alpes